Chaussée d'Antin–La Fayette is a station on Line 7 and Line 9 of the Paris Métro. The station was opened on 5 November 1910 with the opening of the first section of the line from Opéra to Porte de la Villette. The line 9 platforms opened on 3 June 1923 with the extension of the line from Saint-Augustin.

History

The station was originally named Chaussée d'Antin after the street of Chaussée d'Antin—which was named after himself by Louis Antoine de Pardaillan de Gondrin, first Duke of Antin (1665–1736) in 1712. In 1989 La Fayette was added referring to famous shopping street of Rue La Fayette, named after Gilbert du Motier, marquis de Lafayette.

The area was once a marsh to the north of the old Porte Gaillon (a gate in the extension of Paris's walls, built under Louis XIII).  Louis XV's frequent visits to Paris led to the building in the area of several splendid residences, including a mansion built by Louis Antoine de Pardaillan de Gondrin, Duc d'Antin, son of Marquise de Montespan (later a long-time mistress to Louis XIV of France) and the King's Superintendent of Building, Louis Henri Pardaillan de Gondrin, Marquis de Montespan.

The main Galeries Lafayette department store in the Boulevard Haussmann is nearby.

In April 2012, a driver mistakenly drove his car into a station entrance, thinking it was an underground car park.

Station layout

Gallery

References

Roland, Gérard (2003). Stations de métro. D’Abbesses à Wagram. Éditions Bonneton.

Paris Métro stations in the 9th arrondissement of Paris
Railway stations in France opened in 1910